Jack Rudy is an American tattoo artist notable for his reinvention of the 'Black and Gray' style of tattooing, realistic portraits, and single-needle use. He is considered to be one of the top tattoo artists in the world.

Career

After leaving the Marines in 1975, Rudy began his career as an apprentice at Goodtime Charlie’s Tattooland, in East Los Angeles. Under the watch of Charlie Cartwright, a friend of his he had met while visiting the Old Long Beach pike while on leave from the USMC Logistics Base in Barstow CA, Rudy and Cartwright began to hone their craft of single-needle, Black and Gray style tattoos. Simultaneously creating a whole new subgenre of modern tattooing and raising the proverbial bar for many new emerging tattoo artists and artists in general. His very distinct and distinguishable style is renowned for its masterful use of light and dark shades of varying degrees of black and grey. In addition to creating a softer and more realistic style of tattooing, with the advent of the new single needle tattoo technology artists were now able to use a much greater level of detail than previously attainable utilizing older and more readily accepted tattoo machine and needle configurations. As the client base of East Los Angeles began requesting this 'penitentiary-style', the pair decided to create a single-needle configured tattoo machine.

Rudy is currently the president of the Beatnik's Car Club - a car club which requires the members to own 50s-styled hot rods and 'lots of tattoos'. He is the owner of Tattooland, an 'old school' street shop, located in Anaheim, California.

References

External links
 Jack Rudy's H2Ocean Pro Team profile

Living people
American tattoo artists
People from East Los Angeles, California
Year of birth missing (living people)